Scythris limbella is a moth of the family Scythrididae first described by the Danish zoologist Johan Christian Fabricius. It is found in Asia and Europe.

Description
The wingspan is about 15 mm. Adults are on wing from June to September, possibly in two generations. The larvae feed on the shoots and flowers of goosefoots (Chenopodium species) and orache (Atriplex species) in a web.

Distribution
It is found in most of Europe (except Iceland, Ireland, and part of the Balkan Peninsula and Ukraine), east into Russia and Iran (from Golestan to Farsi). It is an introduced species in the north-eastern Nearctic region.

References

limbella
Moths described in 1775
Moths of Asia
Moths of Europe
Taxa named by Johan Christian Fabricius